Stygobromus dejectus, commonly called Cascade Cave amphipod, is a troglomorphic species of amphipod in family Crangonyctidae. It is endemic to Texas in the United States.

See also
 Cascade Caverns

References

Freshwater crustaceans of North America
Crustaceans described in 1967
Cave crustaceans
dejectus
Endemic fauna of Texas